This is a chronological list of notable MUDs with summary information.



Legend

List

References

MUDs
 
 
 
Timelines of video games
MUDs